was a Japanese voice actress. Having graduated from the Toho Gakuen College of Drama and Music, she was a member of Production Baobab.

Career
Kawakami debuted in 1994 as a role of a boy in Metal Fighter Miku. Her first regular performance was in 1995 as Chiriko in Fushigi Yuugi. Two years after, she landed her first starring voice role as Utena Tenjou in Revolutionary Girl Utena. Aside from Chiriko and Utena, her famous roles are in Air (Misuzu Kamio), Bleach (Soifon), Chrono Crusade (Rosette Christopher), Hikaru no Go (Hikaru Shindo), Sgt. Frog (Fuyuki Hinata), Ape Escape (Natsumi),Yukiko Kawasaki (Dear Boys), Sugar (A Little Snow Fairy Sugar) & Aria (Athena Glory).

Kawakami provided voices for young boys, girls and comical characters. The best-known genre of her roles are tomboyish characters (Soifon, Utena Tenjou). With such a powerful voice, she was often affiliated in paranormal and yuri-themed anime. She also  made her name voicing the heroine in the Harukanaru Toki no Naka de series, based from the Neoromance game with the same title produced by Koei in 2000.

Illness and death
In August 2008, Kawakami had ovarian cancer, which required surgery. During a three-year battle with cancer, most of her ongoing roles were replaced by other voice actresses, although Kawakami managed to do some voice work until her retirement in early 2010s. She died on June 9, 2011. Her death was met with an outpouring of grief. Kumiko Watanabe, a particular voice actress and a close friend of hers prior to her passing whom worked alongside Kawakami for works such as the Klonoa video game series and Sgt. Frog anime, responded on her web diary with condolences just two days after her death.

Filmography

Anime series
 Air - Misuzu Kamio
 Amaenaideyo!! - Sumi Ikuina
 A Little Snow Fairy Sugar - Sugar
 Angelic Layer - Madoka Fujisaki
 Aria - Athena Glory
 Ashita no Nadja - Shudefan
 Battle Athletes Victory - Chris Christopher
 Best Student Council - Cyndi Manabe
 Betterman - Sēme
 Bleach - Soifon (Episode 24 - 205)
 Cardcaptor Sakura - Rika Sasaki
 Chrono Crusade - Rosette Christopher
 Clannad - Girl from the Illusionary World
 Crush Gear Turbo - Yamano Kimomo
 Cyborg 009 - Cynthia
 Darker than BLACK - Amber
 Dear Boys - Yukiko Kawasaki
 Descendants of Darkness - Kazusa Otonashi
 Detective School Q - Kazuma Narusawa
 Di Gi Charat Nyo! - Chibi Akari, Kareida-san
 Doki Doki School Hours - Akane Kobayashi
 Elfen Lied - Mariko
 Emily of New Moon - Emily Byrd Starr
 F-Zero GP Legend - Sasuke Reina
 Fullmetal Alchemist - Kyle (in episode 9)
 Fushigi Yûgi, Fushigi Yūgi Oni, and Fushigi Yūgi Eikoden - Chiriko
 Gakuen Heaven - Satoshi Umino
 Gaiking - Lulu
 Gakko no Kaidan - Satsuki Miyanoshita
 Genesis of Aquarion - Futaba
 Great Teacher Onizuka - Hoshino (in episode 28)
 Godannar - Luna
 Harukanaru Toki no Naka de - Akane Motomiya
 Hikaru no Go - Hikaru Shindō
 I'm Gonna Be An Angel! - Noelle
 Jigoku Shōjo - Yoshimi Kuroda (in episode 1)
 Jibaku-kun - Pink
 Jinki: Extend - Elnie Tachibana
 Kanon - Sayuri Kurata
 Kara no Kyōkai - Ryougi Shiki (Drama CD)
 Magical Project S - Konoha Haida/Funky Connie
 Kenichi: The Mightiest Disciple - Miu Fūrinji
 Martian Successor Nadesico - Eri, Ai
 MegaMan NT Warrior - Princess Pride
 Mirmo! - Wakaba
 Mon Colle Knights - Fearī
 NieA 7 - Kāna
 Nodame Cantabile - Elise (main story in anime), Puririn (Purigorota)
 One Piece - Amanda
 Onegai My Melody - Flat-kun
 Orphen: Revenge - Licorice Nelson
 Paranoia Agent - "Otokomichi/A Man's Path" manga heroine (Episode 4)
 Piano: The Melody of a Young Girl's Heart - Yūki Matsubara
 Pocket Monsters - Ayame, Takami, Hikari's Mimirol, Pokédex (Sinnoh region)
 Popotan - Mai/Konami
 Power Stone - Ayame
 Rune Soldier - Merrill
 Revolutionary Girl Utena - Utena Tenjō
 Saiyuki Reload series - Lirin
 Saru Get You -On Air- - Natsumi
 Sgt. Frog - Fuyuki Hinata (Episode 1 + 231)
 Shaman King - Pirika, Mini Mongomeri
 Space Pirate Mito - Mito Mitsukuni
 Steel Angel Kurumi - Eiko Kichijōji
 Tactics - Yōko
 The Law of Ueki - Ai Mori
 The Twelve Kingdoms - Rangyoku
 The World of Narue - Ran Tendō
 Those Who Hunt Elves - Annette, Emily
 Those Who Hunt Elves 2 - Annette, Pichi
 Tokyo Mew Mew - Ayano Uemura (in episode 34)
 Touch: Miss Lonely Yesterday - Kōchi
 Trinity Blood - Elise Wasmeyer (in episode 2)
 Uta Kata - Satsuki Takigawa
 VS Knight Ramune & 40 Fire - Trumpet
 Yakitate!! Japan - Princess Anne (episode 31)

Anime films
 Air - Misuzu Kamio
 Bleach: Memories of Nobody - Soifon
 Bleach: The DiamondDust Rebellion - Soifon
 Lupin III: Alcatraz Connection - Monica
 Inuyasha the Movie: Affections Touching Across Time - Hari
 Keroro Gunso the Super Movie - Fuyuki Hinata
 Keroro Gunso the Super Movie 2: The Deep Sea Princess - Fuyuki Hinata
 Keroro Gunso the Super Movie 3: Keroro vs. Keroro Great Sky Duel - Fuyuki Hinata
 Revolutionary Girl Utena: The Adolescence of Utena - Utena Tenjō
 The Doraemons: The Great Operation of Springing Insects - Momo

Video games
 Air - Misuzu Kamio
 Ape Escape - Natsumi, Charu
 Bleach: Blade Battlers 2 - Soifon
 Bleach: Heat The Soul 3 - Soifon
 Bleach: Heat the Soul 4 - Soifon
 Bleach: Shattered Blade - Soifon
 Bomberman Generation - Bomberman
 Brave Story: New Traveler - Yuno
 Growlanser II: The Sense of Justice - Charlone Claudius
 Klonoa 2: Lunatea's Veil - Lolo
 Klonoa Beach Volleyball - Lolo
 Klonoa Phantasy Reverie Series - Lolo
 Magical Drop F - Judgment
 Never 7: The End of Infinity - Yuka Kawashima
 Radiant Silvergun - Reana
 Ratchet & Clank: Up Your Arsenal - Sasha (Japanese dub)
 SD Gundam G Generation - Rachel Ransom
 Sengoku Basara - Itsuki
 Shoujo Kakumei Utena: Itsuka Kakumei Sareru Monogatari - Utena Tenjō
 Skies of Arcadia - Aika
 Sonic Wings Assault - Mao Mao
 Super Smash Bros. Brawl - Fushigisou (Ivysaur)
 Tales of Destiny 2 - Nanaly Fletch
 The King of Fighters 2001 - May Lee
 The King of Fighters 2002 - May Lee
 The Law of Ueki: Taosu ze Roberuto Juudan! - Ai Mori
 The Legend of Dragoon - Meru
 Thousand Arms - Sodina Dawnfried
 Tokimeki Memorial: Girl's Side (Konami Palace Selection) - Fujii Natsumi
 Tokimeki Memorial Girl's Side 1st Love - Fujii Natsumi
 Tokimeki Memorial Girl's Side: 1st Love Plus - Fujii Natsumi
 Viper F40 - Raika Grace
 Viper CTR - Miki

Dubbing roles
 Blue Crush – Anne Marie Chadwick (Kate Bosworth)
 Hearts in Atlantis – Carol Gerber (Mika Boorem)
 Heat – Lauren Gustafson (Natalie Portman)
 Jumanji – Judy Shepherd (Kirsten Dunst)
 The Secret World of Alex Mack - Alex Mack (Larisa Oleynik)

Original video animation
  Amon: The Apocalypse of Devilman -Yumi
 Tokio Private Police -Noriko Ibuki

Successors
Houko Kuwashima - Sgt. Frog as Fuyuki Hinata, Bleach as Soifon
Sayuri Yahagi - Nodame Cantabile as Puririn - Season 2 (Kawakami returned in Season 3)
Kumi Sakuma - Nodame Cantabile as Elise - Season 2 (Kawakami returned in Season 3)
Yuki Kaida - A Foreign Love Affair as Kaoru Omi
Satsuki Yukino - Pokémon Diamond and Pearl as Dawn's Buneary (Hikari's Mimirol), Pokedex, Momoan, additional characters
Shiho Kawaragi - Desperate Housewives as Kayla Huntington - Season 4
Akiko Kimura - Battle Spirits as Mama
Yumi Kakazu - Tales of VS, Tales of the World: Radiant Mythology 3 as Nanaly Fletch
Omi Minami - Elemental Gerard as Ashea
Yuki Matsuoka - Heroes Fantasia as Mileru
Saki Fujita - Cardcaptor Sakura: Clear Card as Rika Sasaki
Rie Kugimiya - Kenichi: The Mightiest Disciple as Miu
Miyuki Sawashiro - Sengoku Basara as Itsuki
Ai Nonaka - Anpanman as Candle-Man
Yuka Imai - Demonbane PS2 game, Super Robot Wars UX as Claudius
Aimi Tanaka - The King of Fighters All Star as May Lee Jinju
Rina Hidaka - Shaman King 2021 as Pirika Usui
Rina Sato - Aria the Crepuscolo as Athena Glory
 Inuko Inuyama - Super Smash Bros. Ultimate as Ivysaur

References

Sources
Nakagami, Yoshikatsu. "The Official Art of AIR" (October 2007), Newtype USA. pgs. 135–41

External links

1970 births
2011 deaths
Deaths from cancer in Japan
Deaths from ovarian cancer
Japanese Roman Catholics
Japanese video game actresses
Japanese voice actresses
Production Baobab voice actors
Toho Gakuen School of Music alumni
Voice actresses from Tokyo
20th-century Japanese actresses
21st-century Japanese actresses